Cefai is a Maltese surname. Notable people with the surname include:

Joseph Cefai (1921–1996), Maltese politician
Giovanni Cefai (born 1967), prelate of the Catholic Church

Maltese-language surnames